Iffat Liaqat Ali Khan is a Pakistani politician who was elected to the Provincial Assembly of the Punjab. She served as a member between 2008 and 2013.

References

Punjabi people
Politicians from Punjab, Pakistan
Living people
People from Chakwal District
Punjab MPAs 2008–2013
Year of birth missing (living people)
Pakistani politicians
21st-century Pakistani women politicians